Durga Khote (14 January 1905 − 22 September 1991) was an Indian actress, beginning as one of the foremost leading ladies of her times, she remained active in Hindi and Marathi cinema, as well as theatre, for over 50 years, starring in around 200 films and numerous theatre productions.

In 2000, in a millennium issue, India Today named her among "100 People Who Shaped India", noting: "Durga Khote marks the pioneering phase for women in Indian Cinema", she was one of the first women from respectable families to enter the film industry, thus breaking a social taboo.

She also ranks among the top ten actresses in mother roles in Hindi cinema, most notable among them were as Jodhabai in K. Asif's Mughal-e-Azam (1960); as Kaikeyi in Vijay Bhatt's classic Bharat Milap (1942); her other memorable roles as mother were in Charnon Ki Dasi (1941); Mirza Ghalib (1954); Bobby (1973) and Bidaai (1974). She has received the highest award in Indian cinema, the Dadasaheb Phalke Award (1983), for lifetime contribution to Indian cinema.

Early life
Khote was born as Vita Lad to a Konkan Brahmin family which hailed from Goa and spoke Konkani at home. Her father's name was Pandurang Shamrao Lad and her mother's name was Manjulabai. She grew up in a large Hindu joint family in Kandewadi. She was educated at Cathedral High School and St. Xavier's College where she studied for B.A. While still a college-going teenager, she married into the Khote family and settled down with her husband.

By the age of 26, Durga Khote was a widowed mother with two young sons; Bakul and Harin. She had to seek work in film to support her children. In doing so, she became a pioneer of sorts: She hailed from a traditional family and the film industry was regarded as the preserve of the base and the bawdy. Also, most of the female characters were played by men at the time.

Early career

Durga Khote debuted in a minor role in the obscure 1931 silent film Farebi Jaal, by the Prabhat Film Company, followed by Maya Machindra (1932). She was soon promoted to play heroine in the 1932 double version (Hindi and Marathi) Ayodhyecha Raja, another Prabhat film, which was the first ever Marathi talkie, and proved to be a runaway hit, where she played the role of Rani Taramati. Indeed, she ventured yet another pioneering trend: Despite working closely with the Prabhat Film Company, she broke away from the "studio system" (exclusive contract with a studio to work in its films on a monthly salary) then in vogue and became one of the first "freelance" artistes of that era by working occasionally with the New Theatres, East India Film Co. (both at Calcutta), and Prakash Pictures.

In 1936, she played Saudamini in Amar Jyoti, which is one of her most memorable roles. The characters played by her were very much like her regal personality and she commanded a screen presence even in front of legendary  actors like Chandra Mohan, Sohrab Modi and Prithviraj Kapoor. 

In 1937, she produced and directed a film titled Saathi, making her one of the first women to step into this role in Indian cinema. The 40s opened for her in a big way, with award-winning performances in Aachary Atre's Payachi Dasi (Marathi) and Charnon Ki Dasi (Hindi) (1941) and Vijay Bhatt's classic Bharat Milap (1942), both of which got her the BFJA Best Actress Award for two consecutive years.

Durga Khote remained active in the theatre circuit for many years, especially the Marathi theatre in Mumbai. She was actively associated with the Indian People's Theatre Association (IPTA) and worked in several plays for the Mumbai Marathi Sahitya Sangh. In 1954, she famously performed the role of Lady Macbeth in V.V. Shirwadkar's Marathi adaptations of Macbeth, as Rajmukut, The Royal Crown, along with Nanasaheb Phatak.

Later career

Durga Khote played a wide variety of roles over a career that was not only long, but also untouched by scandal. She was the inspiration for several generations of Indian actresses, including veterans such as the late Shobhna Samarth, who frequently spoke of how she had been inspired by Khote's example.

During later years, she played several important character roles, such as the mother of the protagonist. Her portrayal of Jodhabai, the queen of Akbar torn between duty towards her husband and love towards her son in Mughal-e-Azam (1960) was well received. In 1963, she acted in Merchant Ivory's debut film The Householder (1963).

She went on to play other widely appreciated character roles in later movies, such as the role of the grandmother of the heroine in Bobby (1973), the hero's aunt in Abhimaan (1973), and the very memorable Bidaai (1974), where she played a mother, a very sensitive role that can make one cry and received the Filmfare Best Supporting Actress Award.

Her final memorable role was in Subhash Ghai's Karz (1980), where she played the role of the mother of Raj Kiran and later, mother to Rishi Kapoor, who played the role of Raj Kiran's reincarnation after the screen death of Raj Kiran in the movie.

She acted in over 200 films in her career. By the 1980s she successfully diversified into production of short films, ad films and documentaries by setting up Fact Films and later, Durga Khote Productions, which produced the Doordarshan TV series Wagle Ki Duniya.

Personal life

Durga Khote was married when she was a teenager to Vishwanath Khote, a gentleman of her own caste and similar social background, in a match arranged by their parents in the usual Indian manner. It was a traditional marriage into an orthodox family, the couple lived a harmonious and happy life, and the marriage was blessed with two sons. Vishwanath was a mechanical engineer who had graduated from Banaras Hindu University. His family was upper middle class and professional, with modern English education and high social standing; his ancestors had been prominent bankers.

Unfortunately, Vishwanath Khote died young, when Durga was barely into her 20s. She and her sons continued to reside with her in-laws, as is traditional in India, but she was not comfortable with her dependent position, especially because her father-in-law was no more, and they were dependent on other family members for their expenses. She thus felt impelled to make a living any which way she could, and the opening in films happened entirely by chance. The fact that she came from a modern and English-educated family meant that, even as a widow, she was able to act in films, which was derided as a disreputable profession in those days.

She thus raised her two sons, Bakul and Harin, single-handedly. Both of them went on to become well-settled in life. But she suffered the loss of her son Harin, who predeceased her and died in his 40s. Harin was married to Vijaya Jaywant, and they were the parents of two sons. After Harin's early death, his widow married a Parsi man named Farrokh Mehta and became famous as the film-maker Vijaya Mehta.

Durga Khote's grandchildren (children of Bakul and Harin) include her grandson Ravi, a filmmaker; granddaughter Anjali Khote, an actress; and grandson Deven Khote, a successful producer who is one of the co-founders of UTV, and who has also directed a film. Deven Khote is noted for producing films such as Jodhaa Akbar and Life in a Metro.

Durga Khote's brother-in-law, Nandu Khote (brother of Vishwanath), was a noted stage and silent movie actor. Two of Nandu's children also became actors in the film industry. His son Viju Khote (1941-2019) was an actor perhaps best known for his role of "Kalia" in Sholay (1975). Nandu's daughter is the actress Shubha Khote, who debuted in Seema (1955) and worked as a heroine in several films before moving to character roles. Still later, she moved to directing and producing Marathi films and also entered television in the 90s. Shubha's daughter, Bhavana Balsavar, is also an award-winning TV actress who appeared in sitcoms like Dekh Bhai Dekh and Zabaan Sambhalke before deciding to settle down and raise a family. Thus, the acting profession which was pioneered by Durga Khote in her family has been fully embraced by her late husband's family.

Durga Khote also had some rather improbable, distinguished relatives with no connection to films. The socialite and politician Sharda Mukherjee (nee Sharada Pandit), who herself served as governor of the states of Gujarat and Andhra Pradesh, and who was the wife of Subroto Mukherjee, India's first Chief of the Air Staff, was Durga Khote's first cousin (her mother's sister's daughter). Sharda Mukherjee's paternal uncle, Ranjit Sitaram Pandit, was the husband of Jawaharlal Nehru's sister Vijayalakshmi Pandit.

Later in life, Durga Khote wrote an autobiography in Marathi, entitled Mee, Durga Khote, which was translated into English as I, Durga Khote, and moved to Alibaug, near Mumbai. Durga Khote died on 22 September 1991.

Filmography

Awards

|-
| 1942
| Charnon Ki Dasi
| BFJA Awards: Best Actress
| 
|-
| 1943
| Bharat Milap
| BFJA Awards: Best Actress
| 
|-
| 1968
| –
| Padma Shri, fourth highest civilian award by the Government of India.
| 
|-
| 1970
|  Dhartichi Lekre
| Maharashtra State Award
| 
|-
| 1974
| Bidaai
| Filmfare Award for Best Supporting Actress
| 
|-
| 1983
| –
| Dadasaheb Phalke Award, the lifetime recognition award for films from Government of India
| 
|}

Honours and recognitions

A postage stamp, bearing her face, was released by India Post to honour her on 3 May 2013.

References

Further reading
I, Durga Khote: An autobiography, translated into English by Shanta Gokhale (2006);  &

External links

 
 Durga Khote filmography
 Film music history – First section titled Until 1935
 Mention of her role in theatre and ads

Recipients of the Sangeet Natak Akademi Award
20th-century Indian actresses
Actresses in Marathi theatre
Actresses in Hindi cinema
Actresses in Marathi cinema
1905 births
1991 deaths
Actresses from Mumbai
Bengal Film Journalists' Association Award winners
Recipients of the Padma Shri in arts
Dadasaheb Phalke Award recipients
Women autobiographers
Indian autobiographers
Indian women non-fiction writers
Women writers from Maharashtra
Articles containing video clips
20th-century Indian women writers
20th-century Indian biographers

Film producers from Mumbai
Indian women film producers
Indian stage actresses
Businesswomen from Maharashtra
Filmfare Awards winners